Is God in Showbusiness Too? is the debut studio album of The Watchmen, released in 1991 by Prescient Thought.

Reception
X Magazine gave Is God in Showbusiness Too? a mixed review and said "overall, these guys are really tight, more so than any unsigned band I've ever listened to. Bandleader Dave Creadeau has a good ear for blending the evil and the ethereal, and that comes out especially well on instrumental tracks such as "Brave New ; World," "Nine-Eleven" and the haunting sample-narrated "Black Rain"." The magazine noted that "the only things that make it sound like it's not a full-on pro-level industrial-dance album are a handful of rough-sounding synth patches and a couple of samples that are kind of clumsily used."

Track listing

Personnel 
Adapted from the Plague liner notes.

The Watchmen
 Boom Fernandez (as Boom Christopher) – guitar
 Dave Mansfield (as Dave Creadeau) – programming, guitar, vocals, production, engineering, cover art, design

Additional performers
 David Secore (as !x! Blaze) – programming, vocals

Release history

References

External links 
 Is God in Showbusiness Too? at Discogs (list of releases)

1991 debut albums
The Watchmen (industrial band) albums